Neocalceostomatidae is a family of flatworms belonging to the order Dactylogyridea.

Genera:
 Neocalceostoma Tripathi, 1959
 Neocalceostomoides Kritsky, Mizelle & Bilqees, 1978
 Thysanotohaptor Kritsky, Shameem, Kumari & Krishnaveni, 2012

References

Platyhelminthes